General Lumley may refer to:

Aldred Lumley, 10th Earl of Scarbrough (1857–1945), British Army major general
Henry Lumley (c. 1658–1722), British Army general
Roger Lumley, 11th Earl of Scarbrough (1896–1969), British Army major general
William Lumley (1769–1850), British Army general